Edgewood Independent School District may refer to:

 Edgewood Independent School District (Bexar County, Texas)
 Edgewood Independent School District (Van Zandt County, Texas)